Li Hejun (born December 1957) is a Chinese engineer specializing in composite material. He an academician of the Chinese Academy of Engineering (CAE) and formerly served as dean of the School of Materials, Northwestern Polytechnical University. He is a member of the Chinese Materials Research Society (C-MRS), Chinese Society for Composite Materials (CSCM), and Chinese Society for Metals (CSM).

Biography
Li was born in Queshan County, Henan, in December 1957. During the Down to the Countryside Movement, he was a sent-down youth in his hometown. After the resumption of National College Entrance Examination, he graduated from Luoyang Agricultural Machinery College (now Henan University of Science and Technology) in January 1982. He taught at Luoyang Engineering Institute (now Henan University of Science and Technology) between 1984 and 1988. He enrolled at the Harbin Institute of Technology where he received his master's degree in 1984 and his doctor's degree in 1991 under the supervision of Huo Wencan and Wang Zhongren both in plastic processing. In 1991 he carried out postdoctoral research at Northwestern Polytechnical University. In March 1994 he was haired as an associate professor the Northwestern Polytechnical University. He was dean of its School of Materials from 2002 to 2016.

Honours and awards
 2002 National Science Fund for Distinguished Young Scholars 
 2016 State Natural Science Award (Second Class) 
 July 2019 Fellow of the Asia-Pacific Academy of Materials
 November 22, 2019 Member of the Chinese Academy of Engineering (CAE)

References

1957 births
Living people
People from Queshan County
Engineers from Henan
Henan University of Science and Technology alumni
Harbin Institute of Technology alumni
Academic staff of the Northwestern Polytechnical University
Members of the Chinese Academy of Engineering
Chinese materials scientists